is Zard's 22nd single released on August 20, 1997 under B-Gram Records label. Junichi Watanabe, the writer of the novel, wrote the title word "Eien" of the CD cover. The single reached rank number 1 first week. It charted for 13 weeks and sold 628,000 copies. When Izumi Sakai died in 2007, it was selected as her fifth best song on the Oricon polls.

Track listing

Usage in media
Eien:the song was used as the theme song of Japanese television drama adaptation of the novel A Lost Paradise

References

1997 singles
Zard songs
Oricon Weekly number-one singles
Japanese television drama theme songs
Songs with music by Akihito Tokunaga
1997 songs